Phùng Quang Thanh (2 February 1949 – 11 September 2021) was Vietnam's Minister of Defense from 2006 to 2016.

Phùng Quang Thanh was an officer of the Vietnam People's Army and a member of the Politburo of the Communist Party of Vietnam. Enlisted in 1969, he fought in various battles during the Vietnam War and was honored with the title Hero of the People's Armed Forces in 1971 at age 22. He was appointed Minister of Defence in June 2006, succeeding General Phạm Văn Trà who had previously retired.

Military career
Phùng Quang Thanh was born on 2 February 1948 in Thạch Đà commune, Mê Linh, Hanoi. In 1967, he joined the army at the age of 18 and was admitted to the Communist Party of Vietnam, then known as the Vietnam Workers' Party, one year later.

In his early years, Thanh fought in various battles of the Vietnam War notably in the Quảng Trị campaign and during the counter-offensive of the Vietnam People's Army against Operation Lam Son 719 where he served as company commander (đại đội trưởng) in the 9th Battalion, 64th Regiment, 320th Division.

During the combat on 10 February 1971, Thanh led a squad (tiểu đội) in defending a hill against a company of airborne troops of the Army of the Republic of Vietnam (ARVN) with aerial support, finally, his unit was able to drive back the attack after putting out of action 38 enemy soldiers for which Thanh alone was credited with eight killed. Two days later, he was once more recognized when Thanh, despite being wounded in the left hand, remained in battle and commanded his platoon to accomplish the mission. For this feat of arm, Thanh was awarded the prestigious title Hero of the People's Armed Forces (Anh hùng lực lượng vũ trang nhân dân) on 20 September 1971.

In June 1971 he was ordered to leave combat to study in the School for Infantry Officers, later in the Academy of Infantry, he was also appointed commander of the 9th Battalion, 320th Division, 1st Army Corps (Vietnam People's Army) (Quân đoàn 1) from 1972. During the war, he received total three Liberation Distinguished Service Medals, 1st Order (Huân chương Chiến công Giải phóng hạng nhất), three Brave Soldier Titles (Danh hiệu Dũng sĩ) and other awards.

After the Vietnam War, Thanh continued to hold several positions in the 1st Army Corps from chief of staff of the 64th Regiment to acting commander of the 312th Division in 1988. In 1991, after two years studying in the Soviet Union and the Military Academy of Vietnam, Thanh was promoted to commander (sư đoàn trưởng) of the 312th Division. Afterwards, he served in the General Staff of the Vietnam People's Army from 1993 to 1997 and as commander (tư lệnh) of the 1st Military Zone from 1997 to 2001.

In May 2001, Thanh became Chief of the General Staff and Deputy Minister of Defence of Vietnam. Five years later, he was elected to the Politburo of the Communist Party of Vietnam and began to hold the position of Minister of Defence of Vietnam, succeeding General Phạm Văn Trà.

2015 health rumours
General Thanh visited France for medical care on 24 June 2015, due to complications from a wartime lung injury. The month-long absence sparked rumors of an assassination attempt; he was reported dead on 19 July by a German newspaper but this later was found to be false; he made a full return to Hanoi on 25 July.

Rank
Phùng Quang Thanh was promoted to Major General in 1996, Lieutenant General in 1998, Colonel General in 2003 and Army General in 2006.

Notes

1949 births
2021 deaths
Generals of the People's Army of Vietnam
Hero of the People's Armed Forces
Government ministers of Vietnam
Members of the 10th Politburo of the Communist Party of Vietnam
Members of the 11th Politburo of the Communist Party of Vietnam
Members of the 9th Central Committee of the Communist Party of Vietnam
Members of the 10th Central Committee of the Communist Party of Vietnam
Members of the 11th Central Committee of the Communist Party of Vietnam
North Vietnamese military personnel of the Vietnam War
Ministers of Defence of Vietnam
People from Hanoi
Military Academy of the General Staff of the Armed Forces of the Soviet Union alumni